Peñalosa or, frequently misspelled, Penalosa may refer to:

People with the surname
Diego Peñalosa, (1690 - ?) Spanish governor of Cuba
Diosdado "Dodie Boy" Peñalosa (born 1962), retired Filipino boxer and a former IBF champion
Enrique Peñalosa (born 1954), Colombian politician and former mayor of Bogotá
Francisco de Peñalosa (1470–1528), Spanish composer of the middle Renaissance
Gerry Peñalosa, Filipino professional boxer

Places
Penalosa, Kansas, city in Kingman County, Kansas, United States